Robert Edward Francillon (1841–1919) was an English journalist and author. He was active in newspapers and periodicals the later decades of the 19th century and rose to be managing editor of The Globe.

Life and career
Francillon trained as a barrister but turned to journalism. He was at various times a contributor to Blackwood's Magazine and an editor of Tatler. He contributed for many years to the Christmas numbers of The Gentleman's Magazine, and sold many short stories to newspapers. (Most of those that were published in Australia can be read on-line thanks to the Trove service of the National Library of Australia.) His novel Jack Doyle's Daughter lets a Lincolnshire gentleman loose in Bohemian London. It has been called an "incoherent" tale involving an "heiress with six possible fathers".

Francillon's review "George Eliot's First Romance (1876)" defends Daniel Deronda from early critics. He notes that as a romance it differs in kind from Adam Bede or Middlemarch: "It lies so far outside George Eliot's other works in every important respect as to make direct comparison impossible."

In 1890, Francillon was reported to be the managing editor of the London newspaper The Globe.

Along with Swinburne, Francillon, belonged to Thomas Purnell's literary club "Decemviri", and was an early member of the neo-Jacobite body known as the Order of the White Rose.
Francillon married a daughter of the composer John Barnett, who was also a goddaughter of Franz Liszt.

Some works by Francillon
Short stories and novelettes, published in Australian newspapers
Olympia
A Queen of Trumps
Queen Cophetua
A Bad Bargain
Esther's Glove
The Seal of the Snake
The Way of the Wind, first published in the London Almanac in 1888
Golden Rod
No Conjuror
Fad and Her Fetish
The Luck of Luke Parris
Veni, Vidi, Vici
A Learned Lady
Silver and Gold
Double Sixes
M or N
Owen Murtagh's Girl
An Obstinate Blockhead
Songs

Books

 Several editions, including free on-line transcriptions

References

1841 births
1919 deaths
English male short story writers
English short story writers
19th-century English novelists
Converts to Roman Catholicism
Neo-Jacobite Revival